2015–16 Saudi First Division was the 39th season of the Saudi First Division since its establishment in 1976. The season started on 21 August 2015 and concluded on 23 April 2016.

On 23 April 2016, Al-Mojzel won the league title and earned promotion to 2016–17 Professional League along with Al-Ettifaq, while Al-Batin qualified to the promotion play-offs. Al-Nahda, Al-Riyadh and Al-Diriyah were relegated to the 2016–17 Saudi Second Division.

On 21 July 2016, the SAFF announced the relegation of Al-Mojzel to the Saudi Second Division due to match fixing. On 3 August 2016, they announced that Al-Ettifaq were crowned champions and Al-Batin would be promoted to the 2016–17 Professional League instead of Al-Mojzel, and they also announced that Al-Mojzel would be relegated instead of Al-Nahda.

Teams

A total of 16 teams are contesting the league, including 11 sides from the 2014–15 season, two relegated from the 2014–15 Saudi Professional League and three promoted from the 2014–15 Saudi Second Division. Al-Shoulla and Al-Orobah join as the two relegated sides. Damac were promoted as champions, while Al-Nojoom were promoted as Group B winners. Ohod secured the final berth by winning the playoffs.

Team changes
The following teams have changed division since the 2014–15 season.

To the First Division 
Promoted from the Second Division
 Damac
 Al-Nojoom
 Ohod

Relegated from the Pro League
 Al-Shoulla
 Al-Orobah

From the First Division 
Relegated to the Second Division
 Al-Safa
 Abha
 Hetten

Promoted to the Pro League
 Al-Qadisiyah
 Al-Wehda

Stadia and locations

League table

Results

Statistics

Scoring

Top scorers

Hat-tricks

Clean sheets

References

External links
 Saudi Arabia Football Federation
 Saudi League Statistics
 goalzz

Saudi First Division League seasons
Saudi
2015–16 in Saudi Arabian football